Abada is a village in Howrah district of West Bengal, India. Its local railway station is Abada railway station.

References 

Villages in Howrah district